Ettore Negretti (1883 – after 1902) was an Italian professional footballer, who played as a striker.

Honours

Club 
Milan F.B.C.C.
Prima Categoria: 1901

Individual 
1901
Top scorer of the Prima Categoria: 4 goals

External links 
Profile at MagliaRossonera.it 

1883 births
Year of death missing
Italian footballers
Association football forwards
A.C. Milan players